Phytoecia croceipes is a species of beetle in the family Cerambycidae. It was described by Reiche and Saulcy in 1858. It is known from Jordan, Syria, Iraq, Cyprus, Turkey, and Palestine. It contains the varietas Phytoecia croceipes var. annulifer.

References

Phytoecia
Beetles described in 1858